EULUMDAT is a data file format used for specification of photometric data especially intensity distributions from light sources such as lamps and luminaries. The file extension is .ldt. The format was proposed by Axel Stockmar (Light Consult Inc., Berlin) in 1990. The format is the European equivalent to the IES file format specified in IESNA LM-63. The data in an EULUMDAT file is usually measured using a goniophotometer. The IES file format is more formally specified and many measuring instruments
support both formats of file.

External links

Definition for the EULUMDAT format

References

Lighting
Computer file formats
Photometry